Mike Crane (born April 8, 1963) is a former Republican member of the Georgia State Senate from the 28th District. Prior to his election to the state senate, Crane was the Republican nominee for the U.S. House of Representatives in Georgia's 13th congressional district in 2010.

Political career
Mike Crane challenged David Scott, the Democratic incumbent congressman from the Georgia-13th, in 2010, but lost the race. In October 2011, State Senator Mitch Seabaugh resigned from the Georgia State Senate and a special election was called, which Crane won. Crane was re-elected in 2012 and 2014.

On January 20, 2016, Crane announced his candidacy for Congress in Georgia's 3rd congressional district to replace the retiring Lynn Westmoreland. He lost the primary runoff election to Drew Ferguson.

External links
 Official Senate website
 Official biography
 Campaign website

References

Living people
Republican Party Georgia (U.S. state) state senators
1964 births
Georgia Tech alumni
People from Newnan, Georgia
21st-century American politicians